At Her Best – Live is a live album by Roberta Flack, released on April 14, 2008. It contains recordings of performances from 1975 and 2001.

Track listing
"The Closer I Get to You"
"River"
"Sweet Georgia Brown"
"Some Gospel According to Matthew"
"Feel Like Makin' Love"
"Reverend Lee"
"Stormy Monday"
"The Thrill Is Gone"
"Why Don't You Move in with Me"
"Jesse"
"Killing Me Softly with His Song"
"The First Time Ever I Saw Your Face"

Roberta Flack albums
2008 live albums